Jocelyn Rickards (29 July 19247 July 2005) was an Australian artist and costume designer.

During the 1940s to 1950s Rickards was one of the Merioola Group of artists. The review of her works in a 1948 exhibition by Paul Haefliger was the source of the coined phrase "The Charm School" to describe these Sydney artists.

In 1966 Rickards won a BAFTA Film Award for the film Mademoiselle.

In 1967 she was nominated at the 39th Academy Awards in the category of Best Costumes-Black and White for her work on the film Morgan – A Suitable Case for Treatment.

Her autobiography The Painted Banquet: My Life and Loves, was published in 1987 by Weidenfeld & Nicolson, and was praised thus by Graham Greene (a former lover of hers): "An outstanding capacity for friendship - rare in the jealous world of art and letters to which she belongs - makes Jocelyn Rickard's autobiography unusually appealing".

Selected filmography 

 From Russia with Love (1963)
 Mademoiselle (1966)
 Morgan – A Suitable Case for Treatment (1966)
 The Sailor from Gibraltar (1967)
 Ryan's Daughter (1970)
 Sunday Bloody Sunday (1971)
 Charlie Chan and the Curse of the Dragon Queen (1981)

References

External links 
 

1924 births
2005 deaths
Australian costume designers
Best Costume Design BAFTA Award winners
Deaths from pneumonia in England
People from Melbourne
Women costume designers